Getge Sara (also Romanized as Getge Sarā; also known as Gatgesar, Gatkah Sarāi, Gatkasarā, Gatka-Saray, Gotag Sarā, and Kangeh Sarāy) is a village in Khaleh Sara Rural District, Asalem District, Talesh County, Gilan Province, Iran. At the 2006 census, its population was 576, in 134 families.

References 

Populated places in Talesh County